The Legislative Assemblies of the Roman Kingdom were political institutions in the ancient Roman Kingdom. While one assembly, the Curiate Assembly, had some legislative powers, these powers involved nothing more than a right to symbolically ratify decrees issued by the king. The functions of the other assembly, the Calate Assembly, was purely religious. During the years of the kingdom, the People of Rome were organized on the basis of units called curiae (singular curia). All of the People of Rome were divided amongst a total of thirty curia, and membership in an individual curia was hereditary. Each member of a particular family belonged to the same curia. Each curia had an organization similar to that of the early Roman family, including specific religious rites and common festivals. These curia were the basic units of division in the two popular assemblies. The members in each curia would vote, and the majority in each curia would determine how that curia voted before the assembly. Thus, a majority of the curia (sixteen out of the thirty total curia) was needed during any vote before either the Curiate Assembly or the Calate Assembly.

Curiate Assembly

The Curiate Assembly (Comitia Curiata) was the only popular assembly with any political significance during the period of the Roman Kingdom, and was organized on the basis of the thirty curiae. The king presided over the assembly, and submitted decrees to it for ratification. An interrex presided over the assembly during interim periods between kings (the interregnum). After a king died, the interrex selected a candidate to replace the king. After the nominee received the approval of the Roman Senate, the interrex held the formal election before the Curiate Assembly. After the Curiate Assembly elected the new king, and the Senate ratified that election, the interrex then presided over the assembly as it voted on the law that granted the king his legal powers (the lex curiata de imperio).

On the kalends (the first day of the month), and the nones (the fifth or seventh day of the month), this assembly met to hear announcements. Announcements often dealt with matters such as the exact date of a future event (such as an upcoming kalends) or any upcoming intercalary months. Appeals heard by this assembly often dealt with questions concerning Roman family law. During two fixed days in the spring, the assembly was scheduled to meet to witness wills and adoptions. All other meetings were held on an as-needed basis. The assembly also had jurisdiction over the admission of new families to a curia, the transfer of families between two curiae, the transfer of individuals from plebeian to patrician status (or vice versa), or the restoration of citizenship to an individual. The assembly usually decided these matters under the presidency of the Pontifex Maximus. Since this assembly was the principal legislative assembly, it was (theoretically) responsible for ratifying laws. However, the rejection of such laws by the assembly did not prevent their enactment. Sometimes, the Curiate Assembly reaffirmed a king's legal authority (called imperium), and sometimes it ratified a decision to go to war.

Calate Assembly
The Calate Assembly ("Comitia Calata") was the oldest of the Roman assemblies. Very little is known about this assembly. The Calate Assembly met on the Capitoline Hill, and was also organized on the basis of the thirty curiae. The purpose of this assembly was not legislative or legal, but rather religious. The Pontifex Maximus presided over the assembly, and it performed duties such as inaugurating priests and selecting Vestal virgins.

See also

 Roman Kingdom
 Roman Republic
 Roman Empire
 Roman Law
 Plebeian Council
 Centuria
 Curia
 Roman consul
 Praetor
 Roman censor
 Quaestor
 Aedile
 Roman Dictator
 Master of the Horse
 Roman Senate
 Cursus honorum
 Byzantine Senate
 Pontifex Maximus
 Princeps senatus
 Interrex
 Promagistrate
 Acta Senatus

Citations

References

 Abbott, Frank Frost (1901). A History and Description of Roman Political Institutions. Elibron Classics.
 Byrd, Robert (1995). The Senate of the Roman Republic. U.S. Government Printing Office, Senate Document 103-23.
 Lintott, Andrew (1999). The Constitution of the Roman Republic. Oxford University Press.

Further reading

 Ihne, Wilhelm. Researches Into the History of the Roman Constitution. William Pickering. 1853. 
 Johnston, Harold Whetstone. Orations and Letters of Cicero: With Historical Introduction, An Outline of the Roman Constitution, Notes, Vocabulary and Index. Scott, Foresman and Company. 1891.
 Cicero, Marcus Tullius (1841). The Political Works of Marcus Tullius Cicero: Comprising his Treatise on the Commonwealth; and his Treatise on the Laws. Translated from the original, with Dissertations and Notes in Two Volumes. By Francis Barham, Esq. London: Edmund Spettigue. Vol. 1.
 Polybius (1823). The General History of Polybius: Translated from the Greek. By James Hampton. Oxford: Printed by W. Baxter. Fifth Edition, Vol 2.
 Taylor, Lily Ross (1966). Roman Voting Assemblies: From the Hannibalic War to the Dictatorship of Caesar. The University of Michigan Press.
 Mommsen, Theodor. Roman Constitutional Law. 1871-1888
 Tighe, Ambrose. The Development of the Roman Constitution. D. Apple & Co. 1886.
 Von Fritz, Kurt. The Theory of the Mixed Constitution in Antiquity. Columbia University Press, New York. 1975.
 The Histories by Polybius
 Cambridge Ancient History, Volumes 9–13.
 A. Cameron, The Later Roman Empire, (Fontana Press, 1993).
 M. Crawford, The Roman Republic, (Fontana Press, 1978).
 E. S. Gruen, "The Last Generation of the Roman Republic" (U California Press, 1974)
 F. Millar, The Emperor in the Roman World, (Duckworth, 1977, 1992).
 A. Lintott, "The Constitution of the Roman Republic" (Oxford University Press, 1999)

Primary sources
 Cicero's De Re Publica, Book Two
 Rome at the End of the Punic Wars: An Analysis of the Roman Government; by Polybius

Secondary source material
 Considerations on the Causes of the Greatness of the Romans and their Decline, by Montesquieu
 The Roman Constitution to the Time of Cicero
 What a Terrorist Incident in Ancient Rome Can Teach Us

Government of the Kingdom of Rome
Historical legislatures
Popular assemblies